Jay Tavare  is a Native American actor and a former blogger for Huffington Post. He is known for portraying Vega in the 1994 film adaption of the video game Street Fighter, and its video game tie-in.

Filmography

Film

Television

Video games

References

External links
 

 Huffington Post blog

1968 births
American male film actors
American male television actors
American male video game actors
American male voice actors
HuffPost writers and columnists
20th-century American male actors
21st-century American male actors
Living people